The McMurtry Spéirling is a record breaking electric single-seat prototype car which was first presented at the Goodwood Festival of Speed in 2021. The car is developed by McMurtry Automotive, a Britsh registered startup founded on June 2nd 2016 by Sir David McMurtry (co-founder and executive chairman of Renishaw plc). "Spéirling" is Irish for "thunderstorm".

History 
According to McMurtry, the motivation behind the car was to challenge the industry trend of increasingly heavier vehicles and, by using first principles design, create a lightweight electric drivers car. The prototype car is the first step to demonstrate what customers will experience on road and track.  It is not currently in a racing series but is built to satisfy relevant motorsport safety requirements, with crash structures and a carbon-fibre monocoque chassis with integral rollover protection.  Its unique performance differentiator is the fan powered downforce system, giving 2,000kg of downforce from 0mph.   

The car was first presented at the Goodwood Festival of Speed on 8–11 July 2021, and driven by Derek Bell. The car had been developed in secrecy over three years.

On 26 June 2022, the Spéirling achieved a new Goodwood Festival of Speed hill climb record, completing the  course in 39.08 seconds with McMurtry test driver Max Chilton behind the wheel.

In December 2022, it claimed the record for the quickest accelerating road car using independent GPS timing with the following time by Mat Watson from carwow on Silverstone: 

 0-60mph in 1.40s
 0-100mph in 2.63s
 0-145mph in 4.98s
 ¼ mile (400m) in 7.97s
What’s also interesting and tantalising at the same time, is that the car was sat on its 150mph limit for approx. 3 seconds during the run.

Specifications 
McMurtry has not published mass and power figures, but are confident that the car will weigh below 1000 kg and have a mass to power ratio of at least 746 kW per 1000 kg (1 horsepower per kilogram). Estimated driving time on a race track at a GT4 pace is about 25 minutes.

The car has rear-wheel drive using two electric motors placed inside a specially designed "e-axle", and uses carbon brakes. The battery is integrated into a separate safety cell inside the monocoque.

Active downforce 
A special design aspect of the car is its active downforce system without the use of large splitters or wings, by means of twin fans which provide an extra  of downforce from a standstill. When the fans are at full speed, they emit about 120 dB of noise, comparable to that of a jet engine at full thrust.

The use of fans powered by separate motors to provide downforce was first conceived of by Jim Hall for the Chaparral 2J, a Can-Am car he designed, constructed and raced in 1970. It was banned at the end of the 1970 Can-Am series. A downforce fan system was also used in the Brabham BT46B Formula One car, which was designed by Gordon Murray. The BT46B raced at the beginning of the 1978 season to great effect before a rule change was made under pressure from other race teams, resulting in a ban on movable aerodynamic surfaces.

Tyres 
The tyre width is 210 mm on the front and 240 mm on the rear, both on 19 inch (483 mm) rims. This is modest for a supercar and is comparable with regular road cars which tend to have tyre widths between 195 mm and 205 mm.

See also

Comparable electric cars 
 Volkswagen I.D. R
 Rimac Nevera
 NIO EP9
 Aspark Owl

Other fan cars 
 Gordon Murray Automotive T.50
 Brabham BT46
 Chaparral 2J

References

External links 
 
 Video: 39.08! McMurtry fan car breaks Goodwood Hill RECORD! | Festival of Speed 2022
 Video: carwow acceleration records, 0-60mph in 1.40s, 0-100mph in 2.63s, 1/4mile (400m) in 7.97s + Walkaround with Chief Engineer 
 Video: The Future of Motorsport Power | Goodwood Festival of Speed 2021, featuring the McMurtry Spéirling at 3:15
 Video: In-depth interview with Thomas Yates, Managing Director of McMurtry Automotive.

Electric concept cars
Hypercars
Electric cars